Lands of Adventure is a role-playing game published by Fantasy Games Unlimited in 1983.

Description
Lands of Adventure is a fantasy system designed for use in historical settings rather than fantasy worlds. The emphasis is on human player characters, who advance by improving in their chosen skill areas. Magic is divided into types that correspond to character abilities. A priest must attract his deity's attention if he wants to perform a miracle. The game includes a 32-page rulebook and a 28-page book that describes medieval Britain and mythical Greece.

Lands of Adventure (1983) featured a system intended to run historical fantasy games.

Publication history
Lands of Adventure was designed by Lee Gold, with a  cover by Bill Willingham, and was published by Fantasy Games Unlimited as a boxed set with a 32-page book, a 28-page book, a sample character record sheet, and dice.

Reception
Richard Clyne reviewed Lands of Adventure for White Dwarf #58, giving it an overall rating of 5 out of 10, and stated that "Coupled with the expensive price it is a classic case of far-too-little, far-too-late."

William A. Barton reviewed Lands of Adventure in The Space Gamer No. 71. Barton commented that "for its Culture Packs alone [...] Lands of Adventure might prove a good buy for any FRPGers who don't consider themselves experts on the specific cultures covered.  As for the game itself, Lee Gold admits in the introduction that it isn't the perfect FRPG.  But then, what is?"

Chris Hunter reviewed Lands of Adventure for Imagine magazine, and stated that "Lands of Adventure is definitely not for the beginner [...] as the amount of 'freedom' would almost certainly leave them floundering. If on the other hand you are a veteran gamer who enjoys perusing new games systems and has a few pounds to spare then this is a must."

Reviews
Different Worlds #36 (Sept./Oct., 1984)

References

Fantasy Games Unlimited games
Fantasy role-playing games
Role-playing games introduced in 1983